Etiella zinckenella, the pulse pod borer moth, is a moth of the family Pyralidae. It is found in southern and eastern Europe and in the tropics and subtropics of Africa and Asia. They have also been introduced to North America and Australia. It is usually a minor pest for many legumes, but can be a serious pest.

The wingspan is 22–26 mm.

Ecology
The caterpillars feed on the mung bean, Phaseolus lunatus and other species of Fabaceae such as pigeonpea, cowpea, lablab, soybean, peas, chickpea, horse gram, green and black grams, Crotalaria juncea, C. micans, C. saltiana, Lathyrus sativus, and Vigna unguiculata. They have also been recorded on Catha edulis (Celastraceae).

References

Phycitini
Moths described in 1832
Moths of Africa
Moths of the Comoros
Moths of Europe
Moths of Japan
Moths of Madagascar
Moths of Réunion
Moths of Seychelles
Moths of Asia
Moths of the Arabian Peninsula
Lepidoptera of Namibia
Fauna of the Gambia
Taxa named by Georg Friedrich Treitschke